The Yellow House at 57–59 Macleay Street, Potts Point, was an artists' collective that existed from 1970 through to the beginning of 1973 in Sydney, Australia. The collective was established by artist Martin Sharp on his return from London at the beginning of 1970. Initially operated as a space for the exhibition of his work, Sharp and filmmaker Albie Thoms expanded the facility in 1971 to incorporate input from a variety of artists and performers. They modelled it on Vincent van Gogh's Yellow House at Arles and the Dutch artist's partially realised dream of establishing an artists' community there. The British Arts Lab movement of the late 1960s was also an influence on Sharp, who was resident in London between 1966-9.

Many well-known artists contributed to the multi-media performance art space that may have been Australia's first 24-hour-a-day ‘happening’. The canvas was the house itself and almost every wall, floor and ceiling became part of the gallery and performance space. The rooms of the house were inspired by Pop Art, Surrealism, Dada and Conceptualism. Overseas visitors to the Yellow House included members of the rock band Pink Floyd, Marty Feldman and David Litvinoff.

Apart from the exhibition of painting, drawing, sculpture and photography, there was also a puppet theatre, light shows, performance of plays and regular screening of films. These included a range of classic, avant-garde and modern works such Luis Buñuel and Salvador Dalí's Un Chien Andalou, Fritz Lang's Metropolis, Phil Noyce's Better to Reign in Hell, Leni Riefenstahl's Olympia and Peter Weir's Count Vim's Last Exercise, as well as works by Albie Thoms, Bruce Petty, Mick Glasheen and Arthur and Corinne Cantrill.

In 1990 the Art Gallery of New South Wales staged an exhibition which comprised, in part, reconstruction of some of the rooms from the Yellow House. A retrospective history of the Yellow House was compiled by Johanna Mendelson in association with the exhibition. The original building survives, though it now houses a mix of residential and commercial development, including the Yellow restaurant.

Notable members
 Martin Sharp
 George Gittoes
 Brett Whiteley
 Ellis D Fogg
 Albie Thoms
 Greg Weight
 Peter Weir
 Juno Gemes
 Bruce Goold
 Antoinette Starkiewicz
 Peter Kingston
 Mick Glasheen
 David Litvinoff
 Tim Burns
 Jon Lewis
 Peter Royles
 Tim Lewis

References

Peter Royles

External links
 NSW Government, Office of Environment and Heritage - Former Artists' Studio "The Yellow House" Including Interior
 The Roger Foley Collection, University of Wollongong Library
 The Yellow House, University of Wollongong
 Martin Sharp Art to Eternity, Peter Royles Youtube video

 Arts centres in Australia
 Australian artist groups and collectives
 Culture of Sydney